Erythroxylum jamaicense is a species of plant in the Erythroxylaceae family. It is endemic to Jamaica.

References

jamaicense
Vulnerable plants
Endemic flora of Jamaica
Taxonomy articles created by Polbot